Change My Name may refer to:

 "Change My Name", a song by Audio Adrenaline from the 2013 album: "Kings & Queens" 
 "Change My Name", a song by Ron Hynes from the 1974 Canadian promotional album: "CBC Radio Canada Broadcast Recording LM 402"

Disambiguation pages